Night Eyes 3 is a 1993 erotic thriller film directed by Andrew Stevens. It is the third film in the Night Eyes series. Like its predecessor, it stars Andrew Stevens and Shannon Tweed, although the latter plays a different role. It also stars Tweed's sister, Tracy.

Synopsis

Zoe Clairmont (Shannon Tweed), star of the hit TV show "Sweet Justice", is being stalked by her ex-boyfriend. As a result, she hires security expert Will Griffith (Andrew Stevens) to protect her. To make matters worse, Zoe also has to deal with a jealous co-star, while Will has to deal with a rival security agency.

Cast
 Andrew Stevens as Will Griffith
 Shannon Tweed as Zoe Clairmont
 Tracy Tweed as Dana Gray
 Daniel McVicar as Thomas Cassidy (as Dan McVicar)
 Tristan Rogers as Jim Stanton
 Todd Curtis as Dan Everett
 Allison Mack as Natalie
 Richard Portnow as Kaplan
 Marianne Muellerleile as Mrs. O'Brien

Production
Night Eyes 3 was filmed within the period of a month, from November 30, 1992, to December 29, 1992. It was filmed in Los Angeles, California.

References

External links 
 

1993 films
1990s erotic thriller films
American erotic thriller films
1990s English-language films
Films directed by Andrew Stevens
1990s American films